Trichomycterus rivulatus is a species of pencil catfish that is native to high-altitude Andean streams and lakes (including Junin, Poopó and Titicaca) in southern Peru, western Bolivia and northern Chile. It is the largest species in the genus Trichomycterus and grows to a maximum length of  TL. The species is regularly caught as a food fish. However, because of pollution, studies have revealed levels of metals in T. rivulatus of Lake Titicaca that exceed the internationally recommended safety thresholds for human consumption.

References

rivulatus
Fish of South America
Fish of Bolivia
Freshwater fish of Chile
Freshwater fish of Peru
Taxa named by Achille Valenciennes
Taxonomy articles created by Polbot
Fish described in 1846